Victor Louis Marie Lanrezac (March 24, 1854 in Brest – January 1, 1916 in Neuilly-sur-Seine) was Governor General of Pondicherry in Second French Colonial Empire under Third Republic. He was made Chevalier of the Legion of Honour in 1899.

References

French colonial governors and administrators
Governors of French Polynesia
Governors of French India
People of the French Third Republic
1854 births
1916 deaths